In linguistics, Illič-Svityč's law refers to two Proto-Slavic rules, named after Vladislav Illich-Svitych who first identified and explained them.

Neuter o-stems
Proto-Slavic neuter o-stems with fixed accent on a non-acute root (accent paradigm b) become masculine, retaining the accent paradigm. Compare:
 PIE  n > OCS dvorъ m
 PIE *médʰu n 'mead' > PSl. *medu m (OCS medъ)

This rule is important because it operated after the influx of Proto-Germanic/Gothic thematic neuters, which all became masculines in Proto-Slavic. Late Proto-Germanic (after the operation of Verner's law) had fixed accent on the first syllable. Compare:

 PSl. *xlaiwu m 'pigsty' (OCS xlěvъ ) < PGm.  n
 PSl. *xūsu/xūzu m 'house'  (OCS xyzъ) < PGm.  n
 PSl. *pulku m 'folk, people' (OCS  plъkъ) < PGm.  n

Masculine o-stems
Proto-Slavic masculine o-stems with fixed accent on a non-acute root (accent paradigm b) become mobile-accent (accent paradigm c). This change is also termed "Holzer's metatony", after linguist Georg Holzer who described it.

Older literature suggests that this was not a Common Slavic innovation, and that there are exceptions in some Croatian Čakavian dialects of Susak and Istria, which have retained the original accentuation. This has been recently disputed.

Notes

References
 
 Willem Vermeer (2001). Critical observations on the modus operandi of the Moscow Accentological School, Werner Lehfeldt, Einführung in die morphologische Konzeption der slavischen Akzentologie, 2d edition, München: Sagner, pp. 131–161.

Proto-Slavic language
Sound laws